Ranqueles steparius is a species of beetle in the family Cerambycidae. It was described by Osvaldo Rubén Di Iorio in 1996. It is found in Neuquén Province, Argentina.

References

Bothriospilini
Beetles of South America
Endemic fauna of Argentina
Beetles described in 1996